"Why Don't They Understand" is a song written by Jack Fishman and Joe Henderson and performed by George Hamilton IV.  It reached #10 on the U.S. pop chart, #22 on the UK Singles Chart, and #18 in Canada in 1958.

The single was arranged by Don Costa.

Other charting versions
Bobby Vinton released a version which reached #23 on the adult contemporary chart and #109 on the U.S. pop chart in 1970.

Other versions
Glen Mason released a version of the song as the B-side to his 1957 single "Crying My Heart Out for You".
Victor Silvester and His Ballroom Orchestra released a version of the song as the B-side to their 1958 single "The Story of My Life".
Lem Winchester released a version of the song on his 1960 album With Feeling.
The Anita Kerr Singers released a version of the song on their 1963 album Tender Words.  It was produced by Chet Atkins.
Wink Martindale released a version of the song as the B-side to his 1964 single "Big Buildin'".
Dave Berry released a version of the song on his 1965 EP Can I Get It from You.
Petula Clark released a version of the song on her 1965 album The World's Greatest International Hits!  It was produced by Tony Hatch.
Cliff Richard released a version of the song on his 1965 EP Why Don't They Understand.
Patty Duke released a version of the song on her 1966 album Patty Duke's Greatest Hits.
Don Spencer released a version of the song as a single in 1966, but it did not chart.
Frankie Avalon released a version of the song as the B-side to his 1969 single "For Your Love".  It was produced by Jimmy Bowen.
The Williams Brothers released a version of the song on their 2002 compilation album Andy & David.

References

1957 songs
1957 singles
1966 singles
1970 singles
George Hamilton IV songs
Bobby Vinton songs
Wink Martindale songs
Dave Berry (musician) songs
Petula Clark songs
Cliff Richard songs
Frankie Avalon songs
Song recordings produced by Chet Atkins
Song recordings produced by Tony Hatch
Song recordings produced by Jimmy Bowen
ABC Records singles
Epic Records singles